The Great Plains Dinosaur Museum and Field Station is a paleontology museum located in Malta, Montana.  Opened in 2008, the museum features exhibits of dinosaurs and other prehistoric fossils that were found in the area and state, including a Triceratops, Stegosaurus, sauropod, and hadrosaurs. The museum includes a fossil preparation lab and hosts dig trips. It is open seasonally.

The museum is a member of the Montana Dinosaur Trail.

References

External links
 Great Plains Dinosaur Museum and Field Station - official site

Natural history museums in Montana
Museums in Phillips County, Montana
Dinosaur museums in the United States
Fossil museums
Paleontology in Montana
Museums established in 2008
2008 establishments in Montana